Zahidullah is an Afghan cricketer. He made his first-class debut for Speen Ghar Region in the 2018 Ahmad Shah Abdali 4-day Tournament on 1 March 2018. He made his List A debut for Speen Ghar Region in the 2018 Ghazi Amanullah Khan Regional One Day Tournament on 10 July 2018.

References

External links
 

Year of birth missing (living people)
Living people
Afghan cricketers
Spin Ghar Tigers cricketers
Place of birth missing (living people)